Rockman may refer to:

 Rockman, the Japanese name for the Mega Man franchise
 Rockman, the Japanese name of Mega Man (character), the titular protagonist of the Mega Man video games
 Alexis Rockman (born 1962), American contemporary artist
 Rockman (amplifier), a brand name of headphone guitar amplifiers and other music technology products
 Rockman Rock, a pseudonym of Jimmy Cauty from electronic music group The KLF
 Rockman (comics), an early Marvel Comics hero
 Rock Men, characters in the Conker series
 Rockman (website), a Norwegian music website
 Rockman Swimrun, a swimrun race in Rogaland, Norway